Injong of Joseon (10 March 1515 – 8 August 1545, r. 1544–1545), personal name Yi Ho (Hangul: 이호, Hanja: 李峼), was the 12th ruler of the Joseon Dynasty of Korea. His father was King Jungjong, and his mother was Queen Janggyeong, whose brother was Yun Im. As the firstborn, he became Crown Prince in 1520 and succeeded his father to the throne following Jungjong's death in 1544.

Biography

Reign

The young king was very ambitious, and tried to reform the government of the time that was rife with corruption, a legacy of the failed reforms during his father's reign.  He rehabilitated Jo Gwang-jo and recruited Sarim scholars who turned away from politics after Third Literati Purge of 1519. His maternal uncle Yun Im exercised great power during this period.  However, Injong was too often ill and died in 1545, just one year after coming to the throne. Following his death, Yun Im was executed by Yun Won-Hyung in the Fourth Purge of 1545 when King Myeongjong (son of the ambitious Queen Munjeong) succeeded the throne.

Death
Some historians believe that Injong was poisoned by the Smaller Yun faction, led by Yun Won-hyeong, to enable Injong's half-brother to ascend the throne. According to unofficial chronicles, there is a tale of Munjeong finally showing love for her "adoptive" son King Injong, after decades of polite indifference (in reality behind-the-scenes hatred).

As Injong went to pay his morning respects, Munjeong's face started radiating with a smile only a  mother could give to her child. Injong took it as a sign that the Queen Mother was finally acknowledging him as the king, and in particular as her own son. He ate the Tteok that his step-mother gave him, not knowing that it would be the beginning of the end. He fell ill slowly, not  enough to create any suspicion, but quickly enough that historians would later pick up on the event. Three days passed before Injong mysteriously died (after only 9 months of rule).

Queen Munjeong's son became King Myeongjong, while Munjeong became Queen Regent. The chronicles also tell that Munjeong was frequently visited by spirits at night after Injong's death. So disturbed was she that she moved her residence from Gyeongbok Palace to Changdeok Palace.

Family
 Father: King Jungjong of Joseon (16 April 1488 – 29 November 1544) (조선 중종)
Grandfather: King Seongjong of Joseon (19 August 1457 – 20 January 1494) (조선 성종)
Grandmother: Queen Jeonghyeon of the Papyeong Yun clan (21 July 1462 – 13 September 1530) (정현왕후 윤씨)
 Mother: Queen Janggyeong of the Papyeong Yun clan (10 August 1491 – 16 March 1515) (장경왕후 윤씨)
Grandfather: Yun Yeo-pil (1466 – 1555) (윤여필)
Grandmother: Lady Park of the Suncheon Park clan (순천 박씨)
 Consorts and their Respective Issue(s):
Queen Inseong of the Bannam Park clan (7 October 1514 – 6 January 1578) (인성왕후 박씨) — No issue.
Royal Noble Consort Suk of the Papyeong Yun clan (숙빈 윤씨) (? – 1595) — No issue.
Royal Noble Consort Hye of the Jeong clan (혜빈 정씨) (? – 1595) — No issue.
Royal Consort Gwi-in of the Yeongil Jeong clan (August 1520 – 25 March 1566) (귀인 정씨) — No issue.
Consort Yang-je of the Yun clan (양제 윤씨) — No issue.

Popular culture
 Portrayed by Jung Tae-woo in the 2001–2002 SBS TV series Ladies in the Palace.
Portrayed by Kim Young-jae in the 2008 KBS TV series Hometown Legends.
Portrayed by Lim Seul-ong in the 2013 KBS2 TV series The Fugitive of Joseon.
 Portrayed by Noh Young-hak in the 2017 SBS TV series Saimdang, Memoir of Colors.

References

1515 births
1545 deaths
16th-century Korean monarchs